John Kalbhenn (born April 14, 1963 in Kitchener, Ontario) is a retired boxer from Canada, who competed for his native country at the 1984 Summer Olympics in Los Angeles, California. There he was defeated in the third round of the men's lightweight (– 60 kg) division by West Germany's Reiner Gies.

Olympic results
1st round bye
Defeated Wilson Randrinasolo (Madagascar) RSC 1
Lost to Reiner Gies (West Germany) 0-5

References
 Profile

External links

1963 births
Living people
Sportspeople from Kitchener, Ontario
Lightweight boxers
Boxers at the 1982 Commonwealth Games
Commonwealth Games competitors for Canada
Boxers at the 1984 Summer Olympics
Olympic boxers of Canada
Boxing people from Ontario
Canadian male boxers